Haydarov is a surname. Notable people with the surname include:

Azizbek Haydarov (born 1985), Uzbek footballer
Ravshan Haydarov (born 1961), Uzbek footballer and manager
Utkirbek Haydarov (born 1974), Uzbek boxer

See also
Heydarov